Otto Erich Deutsch (5 September 1883 – 23 November 1967) was an Austrian musicologist. He is known for compiling the first comprehensive catalogue of Franz Schubert's compositions, first published in 1951 in English, with a revised edition published in 1978 in German. It is from this catalogue that the D numbers used to identify Schubert's works derive.

Life
Deutsch was born in Vienna on 5 September 1883 in a Jewish family.

Following his studies of art history and literature in Vienna and Graz, he worked as an assistant at the Department of Art History of the University of Vienna. His specialization was the Biedermeier period, which led naturally to his interest in Schubert, whose life took place during this cultural era. His scholarly career was interrupted by World War I when he served in the Austrian Army. Following the war Deutsch worked for a time as a bookseller. He also shifted his scholarly interests to historical musicology, eventually becoming music librarian, working in the archives of Anthony van Hoboken. In 1938, when Austria was taken over by Nazi Germany in the Anschluss, Deutsch decided to flee the country, as he was a Protestant of Jewish origin. He lived in Cambridge, England, from 1939 to 1951, returning to Vienna after the war.

Deutsch was a close friend of Heinrich Schenker.

Deutsch died in Baden bei Wien on 23 November 1967 at the age of 84. He is interred in an honorary grave of the Vienna Central Cemetery (group 40, no. 12).

Scholarship
According to David Wyn Jones, Deutsch's work was based on "an abiding belief that historical documents and iconographic evidence constituted the essential ingredients of biographical exposition." Hence, Deutsch composed "documentary biographies" of Schubert, Mozart and Handel; in them, the texts of the old documents are placed in chronological order, strung together with narration and commentary by Deutsch. In these biographies, Deutsch lets the documents speak for themselves, with his supplementary remarks providing clarifications, corrections, and context.

Deutsch also prepared conventional scholarly articles on these composers as well as on Joseph Haydn. He also edited and published musical texts, in particular Haydn's output of canons.

He was awarded the Austrian Cross of Honour for Science and Art, 1st class in 1959.

Works 

 
  (English translation of Deutsch's German original. Eric Blom provided many translations for this work)

Films 
 , film by Claus Spahn, ARD 1983, 60 min.

See also 
 List of compositions by Franz Schubert
 List of compositions by Franz Schubert by genre

References
Notes

Sources

External links

Austrian biographers
Male biographers
Jewish emigrants from Austria to the United Kingdom after the Anschluss
Jewish scholars
Writers from Vienna
Burials at the Vienna Central Cemetery
Mozart scholars
Schubert scholars
1883 births
1967 deaths
Recipients of the Austrian Cross of Honour for Science and Art, 1st class
20th-century Austrian musicologists
Music librarians
Handel scholars